The  Brage Prize (Norwegian: Brageprisen) is a Norwegian literature prize that is awarded annually by the Norwegian Book Prize foundation (Den norske bokprisen). The prize recognizes recently published Norwegian literature.

The Brage Prize has been awarded each fall since 1992 for the following categories: 
 Fiction
 Children's literature
 Non-fiction
 Open class – a class which varies each year.

In addition to these classes, during the first several years the prize was also awarded in the following categories: 
 Poetry
 Textbooks
 Picture books
 General literature

Prize winners

Fiction for adults 

1992 – Karsten Alnæs, for Trollbyen.
1993 – Øystein Lønn, for Thranes metode.
1994 – Sigmund Mjelve, for Område aldri fastlagt.
1995 – Ingvar Ambjørnsen, for Fugledansen.
1996 – Bergljot Hobæk Haff, for Skammen.
1997 – Liv Køltzow, for Verden forsvinner.
1998 – Kjartan Fløgstad, for Kron og mynt.
1999 – Frode Grytten, for Bikubesong.
2000 – Per Petterson, for I kjølvannet.
2001 – Lars Saabye Christensen, for Halvbroren.
2002 – Niels Fredrik Dahl, for På vei til en venn.
2003 – Inger Elisabeth Hansen, for Trask.
2004 – Hanne Ørstavik, for Presten.
2005 – Marita Fossum, for Forestill deg.
2006 – Dag Solstad, for Armand V. Fotnoter til en uutgravd roman.
2007 – Carl Frode Tiller, for Innsirkling.
2008 – Per Petterson, for Jeg forbanner tidens elv.
2009 – Karl Ove Knausgård, for Min Kamp. Første bind.
2010 - Gaute Heivoll for Før jeg brenner ned.
2011 - Tomas Espedal for Imot naturen.
2012 - Lars Amund Vaage for Syngja.
2013 - Ruth Lillegraven for Urd.
2014 - Rune Christiansen for Ensomheten i Lydia Ernemans liv.
2015 - Lars Saabye Christensen for Magnet.
2016 – Monica Isakstuen for Vær snill med dyrene.
2017 – Olaug Nilssen for Tung tids tale.
2018 – Tore Kvæven for Når landet mørknar.
2019 – Nina Lykke for Full spredning.
2020 – Beate Grimsrud for Jeg foreslår at vi våkner.
2021 – Jon Fosse for Eit nytt namn (Septologien VI-VII).
2022 – Ingeborg Arvola for Kniven i ilden. Ruijan rannalla – Sanger fra Ishavet.

Children's and young adult literature 

1992 – Ragnar Hovland, for Ein motorsykkel i natta
1993 – Torill Eide, for Skjulte ærend
1994 – Klaus Hagerup, for Markus og Diana. Lyset fra Sirius
1995 – Liv Marie Austrem and Akin Düzakin, for Tvillingbror
1996 – Eirik Newth, for Jakten på sannheten
1997 – Harald Rosenløw Eeg, for Vrengt
1998 – Stein Erik Lunde, for Eggg
1999 – Erna Osland, for Salamanderryttaren
2000 – Rune Belsvik, for Ein naken gut
2001 – Anne B. Ragde, for Biografien om Sigrid Undset. Ogsaa en ung Pige
2002 – Gro Dahle and Svein Nyhus, for Snill
2003 – Helga Gunerius Eriksen and Gry Moursund, for Flugepapir
2004 – Harald Rosenløw Eeg, for Yatzy
2005 – Arne Svingen, for Svart elfenben
2006 – Stian Hole, for Garmanns sommer
2007 – Linn T. Sunne, for Happy
2008 – Johan Harstad, for Darlah - 172 timer på månen
2009 – Maria Parr, for Tonje Glimmerdal
2010 – Hilde Kvalvaag, for Fengsla
2011 – Inga Sætre, for Fallteknikk
2012 - Kari Stai for Jakob og Neikob. Tjuven slår tilbake
2013 - Brynjulf Jung Tjønn for Så vakker du er
2014 - Annette Münch for Badboy: Steroid
2015 - Torun Lian and Øyvind Torseter for Reserveprinsesse Andersen
2016 – Anders N. Kvammen for Ungdomsskolen
2017 – Maria Parr for Keeperen og havet
2018 – Anna Fiske for Elven
2019 – Ane Barmen for Draumar betyr ingenting.
2020 – Jenny Jordahl for Hva skjedde egentlig med deg?.
2021 – Erlend Skjetne for Eit anna blikk.

Non-fiction 

1992 – Arne Forsgren, for Rockleksikon
1993 – Trond Berg Eriksen, for Reisen gjennom helvete. Dantes inferno
1994 – Einar-Arne Drivenes, Marit Anne Hauan and Helge A. Wold, for Nordnorsk kulturhistorie
1995 – Espen Dietrichs and Leif Gjerstad, for Vår fantastiske hjerne 
1996 – Arild Stubhaug, for Et foranskutt lyn. Niels Henrik Abel og hans tid
1997 – Anne Wichstrøm, for Kvinneliv, kunstnerliv. Kvinnelige malere i Nørge før 1900
1998 – Leif Ryvarden/Klaus Høiland, for Er det liv, er det sopp
1999 – Torbjørn Færøvik, for India – Stevnemøte med skjebnen
2000 – Johan Galtung, for Johan uten land. På fredsveien gjennom verden
2001 – Atle Næss, for Da jorden stod stille – Galileo Galilei og hans tid
2002 – Ivo de Figueiredo, for Fri mann: Johan Bernhard Hjort — en dannelsesreise
2003 – Knut Kjeldstadli (editor), for Norsk innvandringshistorie I–III'''
2004 – Tor Bomann-Larsen, for Folket. Haakon & Maud II2005 – Odd Karsten Tveit, for Krig og diplomati. Oslo–Jerusalem 1978–19962006 – Bent Sofus Tranøy, for Markedets makt over sinnene2007 – Frank Rossavik, for Stikk i strid. Ein biografi om Einar Førde2008 – Bjørn Westlie, for Fars krig2009 – Kjetil Stensvik Østli, for Politi og røver2010 – Tone Huse, for Tøyengata - et nyriktstykke Norge2011 – Simen Ekern, for Roma. Nye fascister, røde terrorister og drømmen om det søte liv2012 – Torbjørn Færøvik, for Maos rike. En lidelseshistorie2013 - Steffen Kværneland for Munch2014 - Marte Michelet for Den største forbrytelsen2015 - Morten Strøknsnes for Havboka2016 – Åsne Seierstad for To søstre2017 – Thomas Reinertsen Berg for Verdensteater2018 – Helene Uri for Hvem sa hva?2019 – Torgrim Eggen for Axel. Fra smokken til Ovnen.
2020 – Dag O. Hessen for Verden på vippepunktet.
2021 – Lena Lindgren for Ekko – et essay om algoritmer og begjær.

 Open class 

1996 – Sven Kærup Bjørneboe, for the essay "Jerusalem, en sentimental reise" (Jeruslam, a Sentimental Journey)
1997 – Liv Marie Austrem and Akin Düzakin, for a children's picturebook "Tvillingsøster" (Twin Sisters)
1998 – Christian Rugstad, for translation of The Year of the Death of Ricardo Reis by José Saramago1999 – Anders Heger, for the biography "Mykle. Et diktet liv"  (Mykle. The Poetry Life)
2000 – Karin Fossum, for the crime novel "Elskede Poona" (Calling Out for You)
2001 – Annie Riis, for poetry "Himmel av stål" (Heaven of Steel)
2002 – Synne Sun Løes, for a children's book "Å spise blomster til frokost" (Eating Flowers for Breakfast)
2003 – Torbjørn Færøvik, for travel literature "Kina. En reise på livets elv" (China. A Voyage on the River of Life)
2004 – Arne Lygre, for the collection of short stories "Tid inne" (In Time)
2005 – John Arne Sæterøy (who signs his work as "Jason"), for the comic "La meg vise deg noe…" (Let Me Show You Something...)
2006 – Kathinka Blichfeldt, Tor Gunnar Heggem and Ellen Larsen, for a textbook "Kontekst. Basisbok i norsk for ungdomstrinnet" (Context. A Foundation in Norwegian for Secondary Schools)
2007 – Jon Ewo and Bjørn Ousland, for a case study for children "Fortellingen om et mulig drap" (The Story About a Possible Murder)
2008 – Øyvind Rimbereid, for the poetry collection Herbarium2009 – Bjørn Alex Herrman, for his translation of Moby-Dick by Herman Melville
2010 – Stian Hole, for the picture book Garmanns hemmelighet (Garmann's Secret)
2011 – Arnhild Skre, for her biographical work Hulda Garborg. Nasjonal strateg (Hulda Garborg. National Strategist)
2012 – Linn T. Sunne, for her young adult novel Lille Ekorn (Little Squirrel)
2013 - Yann de Caprona for his fact book for adults Norsk etymologisk ordbok2014 - Ingvild H. Rishøi for her collection of short stories Vinternoveller2015 - Kjell Ola Dahl for his crime novel Kureren2016 – Gudny Ingebjørg Hagen and Malgorzata Piotrowska (ill.) for Fest og feiring2017 – Cecilie Løveid for Vandreutstillinger2018 – Anja Røyne for Menneskets grunnstoffer2019 – Martin Ernstsen for SULT.
2020 – Thomas Horne for Den store klimaguiden.
2021 – Mariangela Di Fiore and Cathrine Trønnes Lie for Søstre. Min historie etter Utøya.

Honorary Award

1992 – Sigmund Skard
1993 – N/A
1994 – Halldis Moren Vesaas
1995 – Anne-Cath. Vestly
1996 – Kjell Askildsen
1997 – Jan Erik Vold
1998 – Dag Solstad
1999 – Kjell Aukrust
2000 – Eldrid Lunden
2001 – Jon Bing
2002 – Jostein Gaarder
2003 – Karsten Alnæs
2004 – NORLA –  center for Norwegian fiction and nonfiction in foreign countries.
2005 – Jon Fosse
2006 – Kari and Kjell Risvik
2007 – Guri Vesaas
2008 – Kjartan Fløgstad
2009 – Tor Åge Bringsværd
2010 – Herbjørg Wassmo
2011 – Kolbein Falkeid
2012 – Knut Faldbakken
2013 - The Norwegian Public Libraries 
2014 - Vigdis Hjorth
2015 - Einar Økland
2016 – Elisabeth Aasen
2017 – Kari Grossmann
2018 – Klaus Hagerup
2019 – Edvard Hoem 
2020 – Dag O. Hessen
2021 – Liv Køltzow

 Previous categories 

Textbooks
1992 – Askeland m.fl., for Soria Moria1993 – Tore Linné Eriksen, for Norge og verden fra 1850–19401994 – Benestad m.fl., for Tallenes tale – Matematikk for 5 timers grunnkurs1995 – Astrid Carlson, Svein Olav Drangeid og Truls Lind, for HumanbiologiPoetry

1992 – Paal-Helge Haugen, for Sone 01993 – Jan Erik Vold, for IKKE1995 – Øyvind Berg, for ForskjelligPicture books
1992 – Sissel Solbjørg Bjugn and Fam Ekman, for Jente i bitar1993 – Else Færden and Sissel Gjersum, for Garnnøstet som forsvantGeneral literature
1992 – Ida Blom m.fl., for Cappelens kvinnehistorie1993 – Tordis Ørjasæter, for Menneskenes hjerte. Sigrid Undset - en''

References

 Official site 

Brage Prize
Children's literary awards